Santos Place is a 6 Star Green Star office building in Brisbane, Queensland, Australia. Construction began in 2007 and was completed in 2009. It was formerly known as Northbridge before major Australian oil and gas exploration production company Santos bought naming rights for the building in January 2009. Santos occupies eight levels.

Location
Alongside 400 George and 275 George St, Santos Place forms part of the North Quarter Precinct in Brisbane's CBD. A major feature of the building is its direct link with the Kurilpa Bridge which extends over the Brisbane River to the Gallery of Modern Art and South Bank cultural precinct.

The building is near central transport links such as the Roma Street railway station as well as Brisbane's Busway with access at King George Square and Queen Street Mall. The building is also close to major shopping precincts such as Queen Street Mall, Wintergarden and Elizabeth Street all of which feature shopping, restaurants, bars, and nightclubs.

Design
Santos Place was designed by Donovan Hill Architect, and constructed by Hutchinson Builders (in a Design & Construct procurement method). The total cost of the building's construction is A$270 million and it provides 33 000 m2 of floor area. Santos Place is Australia's largest building to receive a 6 star green building design rating.  It features energy efficiency measures such as "high performance double glazing, substantial external sun shading, state of the art ventilation and an energy-efficient gas-powered trigeneration system".  Sensored lighting switches off automatically if no movement is detected after five minutes. Rainwater is collected on the roof and stored in tanks on the top of the building. Construction of the building was done with 20% recycled concrete and 90% recycled steel. It includes a two-level gymnasium and 280 secured basement bicycle parks.

See also

Green building in Australia
List of tallest buildings in Australia
List of tallest buildings in Brisbane

References

External links
 Santos Place: Media Centre

Skyscrapers in Brisbane
Sustainable buildings in Australia
Office buildings completed in 2009
Office buildings in Brisbane
Brisbane central business district
Skyscraper office buildings in Australia